Nedim Jusufbegović (born 30 September 1974) is a Bosnian professional football manager and former player who is the manager of Bosnian Premier League club Velež Mostar.

Club career
Jusufbegović was born in Sarajevo, SFR Yugoslavia, present-day Bosnia and Herzegovina. The first club he played for was Igman Konjic before moving on to hometown club Sarajevo, and later to Velež Mostar.

From there, Jusufbegović would transfer to the Slovenian PrvaLiga in 2002 and play for Olimpija Ljubljana for several years, scoring a total of 17 goals and making 63 appearances before he returned for the last stages of his career to be spent in the Bosnian side Željezničar. 

His final season as a football player expired at Željezničar, and he retired from the game in the transfer season of 2005, during July.

International career
Jusufbegović's very first match for Bosnia and Herzegovina was against South Africa on 8 August 2001, when Bosnia and Herzegovina defeated their opponent by 4–2 in the LG Cup held in Tehran, Iran.

The second and final match he played for the national team was two days subsequent to the victory against South Africa, in the same tournament, this time against the host nation Iran where Bosnia lost 4–0.

Managerial career
Several years after retiring from football as a player, namely in 2011, Jusufbegović was employed as a manager by the newly revitalized Sarajevo club Olimpik. Not until September 2012 did he leave Olimpik, after having been nominated for manager of the year the very same year, coming back for a third time in the same position in April 2013.

In 2015, Jusufbegović left Velež Mostar after 2 years as the club's manager. After Velež, he managed Zvijezda Gradačac from 2015 to 2016, GOŠK Gabela in 2016, Čelik Zenica from 2016 to 2017 and Igman Konjic from 2018 to 2019. In August 2022, he became the new head coach of the Bosnia and Herzegovina U17 national team.

On 1 December 2022, Velež Mostar appointed Jusufbegović as manager for the second time. His first competitive game back in charge of Velež was a 2–0 home victory against Posušje in the Bosnian Cup on 18 February 2023.

Honours

Player
Sarajevo
First League of Bosnia and Herzegovina: 1998–99

Olimpija Ljubljana
Slovenian Cup: 2002–03

References

External links

1974 births
Living people
Footballers from Sarajevo
Association football forwards
Bosnia and Herzegovina footballers
Bosnia and Herzegovina international footballers
FK Igman Konjic players
FK Sarajevo players
FK Velež Mostar players
NK Olimpija Ljubljana (1945–2005) players
FK Željezničar Sarajevo players
First League of the Federation of Bosnia and Herzegovina players
Premier League of Bosnia and Herzegovina players
Slovenian PrvaLiga players
Bosnia and Herzegovina expatriate footballers
Expatriate footballers in Slovenia
Bosnia and Herzegovina expatriate sportspeople in Slovenia
Bosnia and Herzegovina football managers
FK Olimpik managers
FK Velež Mostar managers
NK Zvijezda Gradačac managers
NK GOŠK Gabela managers
NK Čelik Zenica managers
FK Igman Konjic managers
Premier League of Bosnia and Herzegovina managers